Bożęcin refers to the following places in Poland:

 Bożęcin, Świętokrzyskie Voivodeship
 Bożęcin, Warmian-Masurian Voivodeship